Araneus enucleatus is a species of spider of the genus Araneus. It is found in India, Sri Lanka, Myanmar and Sumatra.

See also 
 List of Araneidae species

References

Araneidae
Spiders described in 1879
Spiders of Asia